Cable & Wireless plc v Muscat [2006] EWCA Civ 220 is a UK labour law case, concerning the test for an implied contract between an employee and a place they work through an employment agency. It holds that with reference to the reality of the relationship, an implied contract should be found according to the ordinary rules of construction.

Facts
Mr Muscat was employed as a telecommunications specialist by Exodus Ltd in 2001. In September 2001 he was told he should become a contractor and provide his services through a limited company, which was part of making Exodus more attractive for a takeover bid. Exodus Ltd dismissed him in October and then reengaged his services, paying him through E-Nuff Ltd. In April 2002, Exodus Ltd was taken over by Cable & Wireless plc (C&W). In August 2002, C&W told Mr Muscat (and E-Nuff Ltd) to supply his services through an agency called Abraxas plc. He got a new contract that said:

However, in C&W’s internal documents Mr Muscat was described as an employee. In December 2002, C&W dismissed him. Abraxas paid Mr Muscat invoices for the work done by him. He claimed unfair dismissal. C&W submitted that because the agency paid Mr Muscat, there was insufficient mutuality of obligation between C&W and Mr Muscat.

The Employment Tribunal held Mr Muscat was employed by Exodus at the time of the takeover, and despite the agency contract, he had an implied employment contract with C&W. Since he had been continuously employed for over a year, and TUPER 1981 applied, he was entitled to bring his claim. Judge Serota QC in the Employment Appeal Tribunal dismissed C&W’s appeal.

Judgment
Smith LJ read the judgment for Sir Anthony Clarke MR and Maurice Kay LJ which dismissed the appeal again. In a triangular case, where one works for an end user but is paid by an agency, a judge should consider the whole evidence to find an implied contract, following Dacas. A contract is to be inferred when it is necessary to give business reality to the relationship, and where both mutuality and control by an end user are present. It did not matter whether remuneration was paid by the agency, as long as it was ultimately paid by the end-user. The Aramis was approved. Mr Muscat’s contract with Abraxas did not affect the subsisting relationship with C&W.

See also

UK labour law

Notes

References

United Kingdom labour case law
Court of Appeal (England and Wales) cases
2006 in case law
2006 in British law